Paul Clemens may refer to:

 Paul Clemens (United States Army officer), general officer in the United States Army
 Paul Clemens (author) (born 1973), American non-fiction writer and journalist
 Paul Clemens (baseball) (born 1988), American Major League Baseball pitcher
 Paul Clemens von Baumgarten (1848–1928), German pathologist

See also
 Paul Clemen (1866–1947), German art historian
 Paul Clemence (fl. 1990s–2020s) American-Brazilian photo-artist
 Paul Clement (born 1966), former United States Solicitor General
 Paul Clement (football manager) (born 1972), English professional football manager